The Dugald rail accident was a head-on collision between two Canadian National passenger trains on September 1, 1947, in Dugald, Manitoba, Canada, resulting in the deaths of 31 people.

Background
A westbound Canadian National Railways (CN) train, The Minaki Campers’ Special operating as Passenger Extra 6001 West, was a seasonal excursion service carrying vacationers from the Minaki region of Northwestern Ontario on the Monday evening of the Labour Day holiday weekend. These second orders had been received at Elma, Manitoba. The eastbound train was led by a CN U-1-d-class 4-8-2 steam locomotive numbered 6046.

Collision and fire
By the train order operation rules then in use, Extra 6001 would use the siding at the east switch of Dugald. The conductor of the train reminded the engineer of the Dugald stop one or two miles beforehand, by the air signal line, and received the proper acknowledgement.

Extra 6001 was composed of U-1-a class 4-8-2 steam locomotive 6001, two steel baggage cars, nine wooden gas-illuminated coaches, and two steel parlour cars. After the collision, the wooden carriages of the vacation train caught fire. Strict rationing of steel during World War II had resulted in old wooden cars being kept in service until newer cars could be purchased. The collision began a series of events that caused fires fuelled by compressed gas from broken lines and tanks on the wood coaches that gutted the wooden cars and set fire to oil tanks near the tracks. With the exception of the engineer and fireman of Extra 6001, who died in the initial collision, the fatalities of this incident were caused by the fire. No fatalities occurred in the vacation train's two rear cars or on the Continental Limited. Both of the locomotives involved were rebuilt and repaired by CN after the wreck.

Inquiry
An inquiry blamed the crew of the vacationers' train for failing to obey orders. The inquiry also determined that the crew's error had been precipitated by their seeing a "clear" signal, which implied that the track ahead was clear, and that the Continental Limited dimming of its headlamp while waiting in the station lessened its visibility to the oncoming vacation train. This resulted in both the acquisition of modern rail cars and the improvement of rules regarding operations on the line.

In popular culture
 "The Minaki Train Crash " - episode about the Dugald rail accident from the documentary Disasters of the Century (2000), aired on Canadian network History.

See also

 List of rail accidents in Canada
 List of rail accidents (1940–1949)
 1947 in Canada

References

Notes

Bibliography

Railway accidents and incidents in Canada
Railway accidents in 1947
1947 in Canada
Disasters in Manitoba
Accidents and incidents involving Canadian National Railway
Rail transport in Manitoba
September 1947 events in Canada
Eastman Region, Manitoba